Computer Stocks & Bonds is a 1982 video game published by The Avalon Hill Game Company. It was released for the Apple II, Atari 8-bit family, VIC-20, Commodore 64, IBM PC, and the CP/M-based Heath/Zenith Z-90 and Z-100. It is an adaptation of the 3M bookshelf game Stocks & Bonds, which was originally released in 1964.

Gameplay
Computer Stocks & Bonds is a game in which the stock market is simulated. Players have ten turns, each representing one year, to invest in securities (the eponymous stocks and bonds) with differing risks and yields. The securities' market prices fluctuate annually. The player who accumulates the most wealth by the end of the tenth year is declared the winner.

Reception
Bob Proctor reviewed the game for Computer Gaming World, and stated that "Plausible reasons are given for very large gains and losses but these are after the fact: winning is largely a matter of luck. Two factors make this game unique: it is the only one of the four available for computers other than the Apple and it is the only one which needs only 32K of RAM (instead of 48K)."

Reviews
PC Magazine - Dec, 1982
PC Magazine - Oct, 1983

References

External links
Review in The Addison Wesley Book Of Atari Software 1984
Review in Electronic Games
Article in Electronic Fun with Computers & Games

1982 video games
Apple II games
Atari 8-bit family games
Avalon Hill video games
Commodore 64 games
CP/M games
DOS games
TRS-80 games
VIC-20 games
Video games based on board games
Video games developed in the United States